Kaitlyn Christian and Sabrina Santamaria were the defending champions, but chose not to participate together. Christian signed up with Lidziya Marozava, but they withdrew before the start of the tournament because they were still playing at the Madrid Open. Santamaria played alongside Miyu Kato but lost in the quarterfinals to Julia Lohoff and Renata Voráčová.

Eri Hozumi and Makoto Ninomiya won the title, defeating Estelle Cascino and Jessika Ponchet in the final, 7–6(7–1), 6–1.

Seeds

Draw

Draw

References

External Links
Main Draw

L'Open 35 de Saint-Malo - Doubles
L'Open 35 de Saint-Malo